Vincenzo Bonincontro, O.P. (died 1622) was a Roman Catholic prelate who served as Bishop of Agrigento (1607–1622).

Biography
Vincenzo Bonincontro was ordained a priest in the Order of Preachers.
On 25 June 1607, he was appointed during the papacy of Pope Paul V as Bishop of Agrigento.
On 8 July 1607, he was consecrated bishop by Ludovico de Torres, Archbishop of Monreale, with Juan de Rada, Bishop of Patti, and Metello Bichi, Bishop Emeritus of Sovana, serving as co-consecrators. 
He served as Bishop of Agrigento until his death in May 1622.

Episcopal succession
While bishop, he was the principal co-consecrator of:
Stefano de Vicari, Bishop of Nocera de' Pagani (1610); 
Juan de Espila, Archbishop of Acerenza e Matera (1611); 
Eleuterio Albergone, Bishop of Montemarano (1611); and
Decius Giustiniani, Bishop of Aleria (1612).

References

External links and additional sources
 (for Chronology of Bishops)
 (for Chronology of Bishops) 

17th-century Roman Catholic bishops in Sicily
Bishops appointed by Pope Paul V
1622 deaths
Dominican bishops